Puma Wayin (Quechua puma cougar, puma, Ancash Quechua wayi house, "cougar house", -n a suffix, also spelled Pumahuain, Pumahuin) is a mountain in the Andes of Peru which reaches a height of approximately . It is located in the Ancash Region, Bolognesi Province, Huallanca District, east of Ismu Cruz.

References 

Mountains of Peru
Mountains of Ancash Region